Henry Ramsay Cox (19 May 1911 – 1 December 2005) was an English first-class cricketer active 1930–54 who played for Nottinghamshire and Cambridge University. He was born and died in Radcliffe-on-Trent.

References

1911 births
2005 deaths
English cricketers
Nottinghamshire cricketers
Cambridge University cricketers